Sarah Wambaugh (March 6, 1882 – November 12, 1955) was an American political scientist.

Biography
She was born in Cincinnati, Ohio, the daughter of legal scholar Eugene Wambaugh. She earned an A.B. in 1902 and an A.M. in 1917 from Radcliffe College, in Cambridge, Massachusetts, where she also later taught. She also carried out studies in England; in London and Oxford.

Wambaugh eventually became recognised as the world's leading authority on plebiscites. She was an advisor to the Peruvian government for the Tacna-Arica Plebiscite (1925–26), to the Saar Plebiscite Commission (1934–35), to the American observers of the Greek national elections (1945–46) and to the U.N. Plebiscite Commission to Jammu and Kashmir (1949). During World War II she was a consultant to the director of the enemy branch of the Foreign Economic Administration. She was elected a Fellow of the American Academy of Arts and Sciences in 1944. She died in Cambridge, Massachusetts on November 12, 1955.

Select publications 
A Monograph on Plebiscites: With a Collection of Official Documents, Oxford University Press (1920)
Plebiscites Since the World War: With a Collection of Official Documents, University of California (1933)
The Saar Plebiscite: With a Collection of Official Documents, Harvard University Press (1940)

References

External links
 Sarah Wambaugh Papers. Schlesinger Library, Radcliffe Institute, Harvard University

1882 births
1955 deaths
American women political scientists
American political scientists
Fellows of the American Academy of Arts and Sciences
Scientists from Cincinnati
Radcliffe College alumni
Radcliffe College faculty
20th-century political scientists